The Greene County Courthouse in Greensboro in Greene County, Georgia was built in 1849.  It was listed on the National Register of Historic Places in 1980.

It is a three-story Greek Revival-style brick courthouse built in 1848–49, and expanded in 1938 with two wings.  Its third story was added by and for the local Masonic organization.  It is located on Georgia Route 12.

The listing included three contributing buildings.

David Demarest was a master carpenter and practical architect.  He also built the Old Spalding County Courthouse in Griffin, Georgia.

References

National Register of Historic Places in Greene County, Georgia
Greek Revival architecture in Georgia (U.S. state)
Government buildings completed in 1849
County courthouses in Georgia (U.S. state)
Masonic buildings in Georgia (U.S. state)
Courthouses on the National Register of Historic Places in Georgia (U.S. state)
Individually listed contributing properties to historic districts on the National Register in Georgia (U.S. state)
1849 establishments in Georgia (U.S. state)